Yayıkağıl is a village in the Nazımiye District, Tunceli Province, Turkey. The village is populated by Kurds of the Şadiyan tribe and had a population of 56 in 2021.

The hamlets of Bayramlı, Çatan, Çığır, Dağdibi, Kuyulu and Şirin are attached to the village.

References 

Villages in Nazımiye District
Kurdish settlements in Tunceli Province